The 1981 Ball State Cardinals football team was an American football team that represented Ball State University in the Mid-American Conference (MAC) during the 1981 NCAA Division I-A football season. In its fourth season under head coach Dwight Wallace, the team compiled a 4–7 record (2–6 against MAC opponents) and finished in eighth place out of ten teams in the conference. The team played its home games at Ball State Stadium in Muncie, Indiana.

The team's statistical leaders included Doug Freed with 1,517 passing yards, Terry Lymon with 633 rushing yards, Stevie Nelson with 635 receiving yards, and Mike Schafer with 49 points scored.

Schedule

References

Ball State
Ball State Cardinals football seasons
Ball State Cardinals football